Hoonah Seaplane Base  is a state-owned public-use seaplane base located in Hoonah, Alaska. It is included in the National Plan of Integrated Airport Systems for 2011–2015, which categorized it as a general aviation facility.

Facilities 
Hoonah Seaplane Base has one seaplane landing area designated E/W which measures 9,000 by 5,000 feet (2,743 x 1,524 m).

See also 
 Hoonah Airport
 List of airports in Alaska

References

External links 
 FAA Alaska airport diagram (GIF)
 Topographic map from USGS The National Map

Airports in the Hoonah–Angoon Census Area, Alaska
Seaplane bases in Alaska